Moruchi Mavshi (Devanagari:मोरूची मावशी) is a Marathi play written by playwright Pralhad Keshav Atre based on the English play Charley's Aunt. The play is a light hearted comedy. It is best known for Vijay Chavan's iconic role in this famous Marathi Stage drama where he regaled in the title role of Moru's aunt.

Synopsis
Set in the post-Independence era when different sansthans (princely states) of India were being demolished, the play deals with three college friends Moru (Prashant Damle), Bhaiyya (Pradeep Patwardhan) and Bandya (Vijay Chavan). Moru and Bhaiyya are sharing a bungalow they have rented. Moru's aunt, the queen of Kanda Sansthan, is coming visiting. So Moru and Bhaiyya call their girlfriends from their neighborhood to give her company but at the last minute the aunt's visit is cancelled and Bandya, who is playing a female part for a theatre group is coaxed by his two friends to become Moru's aunt. What follows is a fun-filled drama with Bhaiyya's uncle and the girls' uncle proposing to mavshi and the arrival of the real mavshi and her niece who happens to be Bandya's girlfriend.

Style
Singing and dancing are used here to good effect laced with comedy. The main highlight of the play was 'Tang ting tinga', a song from the play where Chavan is at his best - dancing, jumping, playing games in a sari.

Original cast and crew
Vijay Chavan : Moru's aunt, the Queen of Kanda Sansthan
Prashant Damle : Moru
Pradeep Patwardhan : Bhaiya
Artist : Vijay Chavan, Prashant Damle, Pradeep Patwardhan, Suresh Takle, Vijay Salvi, Vasanti Nimkar, Roshni Murkar, Chetna Gadgil, Shilpa Parkar, Narayan Sardal
Ashok Patki : Music
Sunil Barve : Sutradhar
Mangesh Kadam : Direction 
Dilip Kolhatkar : Rangamanch Direction
Nilesh Shinde : Assistant Rangamanch Direction

New cast and crew
After the success of an old 'Moruchi Mavshi' which was released in 1985, Suyog Productions has launched the remake of 'Moruchi Mavshi' with an all new star cast in January 2014. The play is hilarious and ends on a very positive note. Bharat Jadhav is Playing  Moruchi Mavshi in the new set. The play started on 26th Jan. 2014. 
Bharat Jadhav : Moru's aunt, the Queen of Kanda Sansthan, Bandya/ Prabhakar
 Ashutosh Gokhale : Moru
 Advait Dadarkar : Bhaiyaji
 Tejshree Sawant : Usha
 Rekha Kambli : Nisha

The other crew is Ashutosh Gokhale, Nagesh Morvekar, Mahesh Kokate, Esha Vadanekar, Malvika Marathe.

The new set production team is as follows:
 Production : Suyog Productions
 Producer : Sudhir Bhat & Gopal Algeri
 Writer : Acharya Atre
 Director : Mangesh Kadam
 Music Composer : Ashok Patki
 Set Design : Pradeep Mule
 Lights : Kishor Ingle

Film adaptation
It's the same play which has inspired Govinda's drag act in Aunty No. 1 (1998).

References

External links
Moruchi Mavshi comedy natak

Indian plays
Indian plays adapted into films
Marathi-language plays
Theatre in India